The Argentina Classic is a men's professional golf tournament held in Argentina and has been part of the PGA Tour Latinoamérica schedule since 2012.

The tournament was first played on PGA Tour Latinoamérica in December 2012 as the "Olivos Golf Classic-Copa Personal" and was held at Olivos Golf Club. The inaugural winner of the event was Ariel Cañete. 

In the 2013 season the event moved to La Reserva Cardales and following a sponsorship deal with the telecommunications company BlackBerry the tournament was renamed as the "Personal Classic presentado por BlackBerry". 

From 2014 to 2017, the event was played at C.C.G. Las Praderas de Lujan in Luján, Buenos Aires. The tournament moved to Chapelco Golf Club in Neuquén in 2018.

Winners

Notes

References

External links
Coverage on the PGA Tour Latinoamérica official site

PGA Tour Latinoamérica events
Golf tournaments in Argentina
Recurring sporting events established in 2012
2012 establishments in Argentina